Saback is a surname. Notable people with the surname include:

Simone Saback (born 1956), Brazilian singer-songwriter and composer